Andrew or Andy Thomas may refer to:

Andrew Thomas (Australian politician) (1936–2011), Australian Senator
Andrew Thomas (American politician) (born 1966), former county attorney for Maricopa County, Arizona
Andrew Thomas (composer) (born 1939), American composer and musician
Andrew Thomas (American football) (born 1999), American football offensive tackle
Andrew J. Thomas (1875–1965), self-taught American architect who was known for designing garden apartment complexes
 A. R. B. Thomas (Andrew Rowland Benedick Thomas, 1904–1985), English amateur chess player
Drew Thomas, pseudonym of actor Steve Kramer
Andrew Thomas, American-German singer, a member of the band Bad Boys Blue
Andy Thomas (born 1951), Australian astronaut
Andy Thomas (footballer, born 1962), English footballer
Andy Thomas (footballer, born 1977), English footballer
Andy Thomas (footballer, born 1982), English footballer
Andrew Thomas (footballer, born 1998), Russian footballer of English-American descent

See also